Beena Antony is an Indian actress appearing in Malayalam film and television. She mainly appeared in supporting roles in films and television serials in her later career, including Ommanathinkalpakshi, Mayaseetha, Ente Manasaputhri, Autograph and Thapasya.

Early life
Beena Antony was born in Ernakulam as the second youngest daughter of Antony and Lilly. She completed her schooling from Guardian Angels UP School, Manjummel. She was quite active in her parish church, Our Lady of Immaculate Conception Church (Manjummel Palli).

Career
She made her film debut in 1991 through the film Kanalkkattu.

Beena Antony appeared in a number of popular Doordarshan serials till the mid-1990s. The popular serial Oru Kudayum Kunju Pengalum gave her more fame. She appeared in some of the popular serials such as Ente Manasaputhri (Asianet), Ammakkili (Asianet), Indhraneelam (Amrita TV), Autograph (Asianet), Aalippazham, Nirakkootu, Charulatha (Surya TV), Ommanathingalpakshi, Sree Ayyappanum Vavarum, Indhira, Kunjalimarrikkiar, Ente Alphonsamma, Mayaseetha, Butterflies, Ardhachandrante Rathri, Abhinethri, Amala, Sarayu (Surya TV), Pranayam, Kasthooriman (Asianet) are a few famous serials she has been a part of.

Filmography

Television

Partial list

Radio drama
 Sagara Rajakumari

Television shows

Reality shows
 Thakarppan Comedy (as contestant)
 Kuttikalavara (as mentor)
 Comedy Stars (as mentor)
 Sundari Neeyum Sundaran NJanum (as contestant)
 Tharotsavam (as contestant)
 Nakshathradeepangal (as contestant)
 Super Jodi (as contestant)
 Amma Ammayiyamma (as Judge)
 Hairomax Mrs. Kerala (as Judge)
 Josco Super Dancer Junior (as Judge)
 Comedy Challenge (as Judge)
 Komady Circus (Mazhavil Manorama)
 Red Carpet (as mentor)

Game shows as participant
 Sarigama (Asianet)
 Pachakuthira  (Kairali TV)
 Rani Maharani (Surya TV)
 Suryolsavam Super Challenge (Surya TV)
 Smart Show (Flowers)
 Thara Kabadi (Flowers)
 Keralolsavam (Surya TV)
 Start Music Aaradhyam Padum (Asianet)
 Super Bumper Season 3 (Zee Keralam)
 Start Music Aaradhyam Padum Season 2 (Asianet)
 Parayam Nedam (Amrita TV)
 Start Music Aaradhyam Padum Season 3 (Asianet)
 Valkannadi (Asianet)
 Bzinga (Zee Keralam)
 Panam Tharum Padam (Mazhavil Manorama)
 My G Flowers Oru Kodi (Flowers)

As host
 Super Chef - (Asianet Plus)
 Taste Time - (Asianet)
 Ruchivismayam (Mazhavil Manorama)
 Ruchibhedam (ACV)
 Taste of Kerala (Amrita TV)
 Thezbeen (YouTube)
 Thaninadan (Mazhavil Manorama)
 Atham Pathu Ruchi 2020 (Mazhavil Manorama)
 Onnonnara Ruchi (Zee Keralam)

Other shows
 Onnum Onnum Moonu (Mazhavil Manorama)
 Ivide Inganannu Bhai (Mazhavil Manorama)
 Chaya Koppayile Kodumkattu (Mazhavil Manorama)
 Parambarapayasam (Mazhavil Manorama)
 Manam Pole Maangalyam (Jaihind TV)
 Njangalkkum Parayanund (Mathrubhumi News)
 Grihasakhi (Jeevan TV)
 Star Jam (Kappa TV)
 Annie's Kitchen (Amrita TV)
 Amrita Online Chat Room (Amrita TV)
 A Chat With Celebrity (Amrita TV)
 Lal Salam (Amrita TV)
 Snehitha (Amrita TV) 
 Malayali Durbar (Amrita TV)
 Ladies Corner (Janam TV)
 Gulumal (Surya TV)
 Atma Suryotsavam (Surya TV)
 Serial Diary (Surya TV)
 Johnson's Baby Powder Shishu Samrakshanam  (Surya TV) 
 Manassiloru Mazhavillu (Kairali TV)
 Veettamma (Kairali TV)
 Nammal Thammil (Asianet)
 Angane Oru Vishukalathu (Asianet)
 Best Family(Asianet)
 Star Candid (Asianet)
 My Partner (Asianet)
 Comedy Challenge (Asianet Plus)
 Labour Room (Asianet Plus)
 Run Baby Run (Asianet Plus)
 Don't Do Don't Do (Asianet Plus)
 Musik Plus (Asianet Plus)
 Ennishtam (ACV)
 Thiranottam (ACV)
 Day with a Star  (Kaumudy TV)
 Oru Hindustani Onam (Kaumudy TV)
 Flowers top singer 3(Flowers)
 Maamankam Oru Tharamamangam (Flowers)
 Innathe Chinthavishayam (Flowers)
 Tharadambathimarude Samsthana Sammelanam(Flowers)
 Ormakal Marikkumo (DD Malayalam)
 Aanamalayila Aanapappan
 Redlink Online
 Hi Hello with Helen
 Serial Today
 Choych Choych Povam
 Cinematheque
 Dinner Talk
 Icebreak with Veena
 Indian Cinema Gallery

References

External links
 

Year of birth missing (living people)
Living people
Indian film actresses
Actresses in Malayalam television
Indian television actresses
20th-century Indian actresses
21st-century Indian actresses
Actresses in Malayalam cinema
Actresses from Kochi
Indian voice actresses
Child actresses in Malayalam cinema